The 27th annual Berlin International Film Festival was held from 24 June – 5 July 1977. The festival opened with Nickelodeon by Peter Bogdanovich. The Golden Bear was awarded to the Soviet Union film The Ascent directed by Larisa Shepitko. Since this edition, the annual Retrospective and Homage events has been coordinated jointly between the festival organization and the Deutsche Kinemathek. The retrospective shown at the festival was dedicated to German actress Marlene Dietrich, which was divided into two parts, with Part 1 being shown this year along with the retrospective called Love, Death and Technology. Cinema of the Fantastical 1933–1945. The guest of the Homage was West German filmmaker Wilfried Basse.

Jury

The following people were announced as being on the jury for the festival:
 Senta Berger, actress and producer (Austria) – Jury President
 Ellen Burstyn, actress (United States)
 Helène Vager, producer (France)
 Rainer Werner Fassbinder, director, screenwriter, actor and producer (West Germany)
 Derek Malcolm, journalist and film critic (United Kingdom)
 Andrei Mikhalkov-Konchalovsky, director and screenwriter (Soviet Union)
 Ousmane Sembène, director and screenwriter and writer (Senegal)
 Humberto Solás, director and screenwriter (Cuba)
 Basilio Martín Patino, director and screenwriter (Spain)

Films in competition
The following films were in competition for the Golden Bear award:

Out of competition
 Caudillo, directed by Basilio Martín Patino (Spain)
 Per questa notte, directed by Carlo Di Carlo (Italy)
 Nickelodeon, directed by Peter Bogdanovich (United Kingdom, USA)

Key
{| class="wikitable" width="550" colspan="1"
| style="background:#FFDEAD;" align="center"| †
|Winner of the main award for best film in its section
|-
| colspan="2"| The opening and closing films are screened during the opening and closing ceremonies respectively.
|}

Retrospective and Homage
The following films were shown in the retrospective dedicated to Marlene Dietrich (Part 1): 

The following films were shown in the retrospective "Love, Death and Technology. Cinema of the Fantastical 1933–1945":

Awards
The following prizes were awarded by the Jury:
 Golden Bear: The Ascent by Larisa Shepitko
 Silver Bear – Special Jury Prize: Le diable probablement by Robert Bresson
 Silver Bear for Best Director: Manuel Gutiérrez Aragón for Camada negra
 Silver Bear for Best Actress: Lily Tomlin for The Late Show
 Silver Bear for Best Actor: Fernando Fernán Gómez for El anacoreta
 Silver Bear:
 Herkulesfürdöi emlék by Pál Sándor
 Los albañiles by Jorge Fons
FIPRESCI Award
The Ascent by Larisa Shepitko
Perfumed Nightmare by Kidlat Tahimik

References

External links
27th Berlin International Film Festival 1977
1977 Berlin International Film Festival
Berlin International Film Festival:1977 at Internet Movie Database

27
1977 film festivals
1977 in West Germany
1970s in West Berlin